Hebenstretia fastigiosa is a species of plant from South Africa. It belongs to the figwort family.

Description 
It has suberect branches with narrow, slightly toothed leaves. Long spikes of flowers are present between August and October. They are white and hairless with sessile anthers. The fruit is top-shaped and pointed. The upper mericarp is larger.

Distribution and habitat 
This plant is endemic to the Western Cape of South Africa. It grows in sandstone and granite fynbos areas.

Conservation 
This plant is classified as being of least concern by the South African National Biodiversity Institute. While it is declining in some areas due to urbanisation, this decline is not deemed significant enough to give it a higher rating. It has several fragmented subpopulations as a consequence of historical land change for agriculture. As it is a habitat specialist, it is unlikely that Hebenstretia fastigiosa is suitable for cultivation.

References 

Flora of South Africa
Scrophulariaceae